The 2021 Canadian federal election was held on September 20, 2021, to elect members of the House of Commons to the 44th Canadian Parliament. The writs of election were issued by Governor General Mary Simon on August 15, 2021, when Prime Minister Justin Trudeau requested the dissolution of parliament for a snap election.

Trudeau won a third term as prime minister, his second minority government. Though the Liberals were hoping to win a majority government to govern alone, the results were mostly unchanged from the 2019 Canadian federal election. The Liberals won the most seats at 160; as this fell short of the 170 seats needed for a majority in the House of Commons, they formed a minority government with support from other parties. The Liberals set a record for the lowest vote share of a party that would go on to form government, winning 32.6 per cent of the popular vote, while losing the popular vote to the Conservatives as they did in 2019.

The Conservatives led by Erin O'Toole won 119 seats, two fewer than their result in 2019, and continued as the Official Opposition. The Bloc Québécois led by Yves-François Blanchet won 32 seats, unchanged from the prior election. The New Democratic Party led by Jagmeet Singh won 25 seats, a net increase of one seat, but nonetheless fell short of expectations. The Green Party maintained two seats but party leader Annamie Paul was defeated for the third time in her riding of Toronto Centre. The party received 2.3 per cent of the popular vote, approximately a third of what they won in 2019. The People's Party did not win any seats, despite winning nearly 5 per cent of the popular vote, and party leader Maxime Bernier was defeated for the second time in his riding of Beauce.

Following the election, Paul resigned as Green Party leader two months after the election, and O'Toole was ousted as leader by his party's caucus in February 2022 over the poor showing in the election and other controversies ongoing at the time. In March 2022, the NDP formed a confidence and supply agreement with the Liberals.

Background
The 2019 Canadian federal election resulted in the Liberals, led by incumbent Prime Minister Justin Trudeau, losing both their parliamentary majority and the popular vote but nevertheless winning the most seats and remaining in office as a minority government. The Conservatives, who had gained seats and won the popular vote, continued as the Official Opposition. The Bloc Québécois regained official party status and became the third party, replacing the New Democrats in that role, with the latter party losing seats but maintaining official party status as the fourth party. Although the Greens increased their seats in the House of Commons, they ultimately failed to achieve the required number of MPs (twelve) for official party status, and no other party won any seats.

In the immediate aftermath of the 2019 federal election, all leaders initially announced that they would continue as the heads of their respective parties into the 43rd Canadian Parliament. Elizabeth May said that she might not lead the Greens into the 44th federal election, and ultimately resigned as Green Party leader on November 4, 2019. On November 6, 2019, the members of the Conservative caucus decided to not adopt a measure which would have given them the ability to remove Andrew Scheer as leader; his leadership would still have been reviewed at the party's next convention, which was scheduled for April 2020. On December 12, Scheer announced his intention to resign as leader. He stayed on until his successor Erin O'Toole was chosen and remains as the MP for Regina—Qu'Appelle.

On August 15, 2021, after a request from Prime Minister Trudeau, the governor general dissolved parliament and called an election for September 20. The election was called on the same day as the fall of Kabul.

Political parties and standings
The table below lists parties represented and seats held in the House of Commons after the 2019 federal election, at dissolution, and after the 2021 federal election. An expected by-election in Haldimand—Norfolk to fill the vacant seat was rendered moot by the commencement of the general election.

Incumbents not running for re-election
Below are the 31 MPs who chose not to run in the 2021 federal election.

Incumbent not renominated

One MP was not renominated by his party:

Timeline

2019

November 4, 2019: Elizabeth May resigns as leader of the Green Party of Canada, triggering a leadership election scheduled for October 2020.
December 12, 2019: Andrew Scheer announces his intention to step down as leader of the Conservative Party of Canada, triggering a leadership election scheduled for August 2020.

2020

August 23–24, 2020: Erin O'Toole is elected leader of the Conservative Party.
October 3, 2020: Annamie Paul is elected leader of the Green Party.

2021

August 15, 2021: Parliament is dissolved and writs of election are dropped.
September 2, 2021: 1st French language leaders' debate, organized by TVA Nouvelles.
September 8, 2021: 2nd French language leaders' debate, organized by the Leaders' Debate Commission.
September 9, 2021: English language leaders' debate, organized by the Leaders' Debate Commission.
September 10–13, 2021: Advance polling.
September 14, 2021: Last day to apply online for mail-in voting. Last day to vote by Special Ballot at a Returning Office.
September 20, 2021: Election Day.

Endorsements

Campaign

Early campaign (August 2021) 

The election call occurred at the same time as the fall of Kabul, on August 15. Trudeau thus received criticism for not acting fast enough in the face of the 2021 Taliban offensive to evacuate Canadians from Afghanistan, as well as Afghans who supported Canada's military and diplomatic efforts during the War.

Criticism of Trudeau's decision to call an early election, particularly amidst the COVID-19 pandemic in Canada, was a major theme of his opponents' campaigns, and commentators noted a lack of support for a snap election amongst the public.

The beginning of the campaign proved difficult for the Liberals, who slightly fell behind the Conservatives in the polls of voting intentions. The Conservative released their platform on the second day of the campaign. The party tried to change its image with this document by putting more focus on the environment, mental health, and LGBTQ+ rights issues. Meanwhile, Trudeau attacked the new Conservative leader Erin O'Toole on the topics of compulsory vaccination for federal officials, abortion and the privatization of health care.

On August 25, Minister for Women and Gender Equality Maryam Monsef referred to the Taliban as "our brothers". Many on social media shared the video of this statement, and saw this as an indication that she felt sympathetic to the terrorist group. Monsef said that this was false, and further stated that she only chose those words because Muslims tend to refer to each other as "brothers".

On August 27, 2021, Trudeau was forced to cancel a campaign rally set for Bolton, Ontario, over security concerns arising from groups of protestors yelling obscenities at Trudeau. There were previous incidents of protesters showing up at his rallies criticizing COVID-19 vaccines and public health measures.

Issues on the campaign trail

Foreign policy
Foreign policy debates focused on China and the situation in Afghanistan. For Afghanistan, discussions focused on ways to mitigate the immediate humanitarian crisis facing the country. The group Canadian Campaign for Afghan Peace launched an open letter on August 17 calling on political parties to take position of the new situation in Afghanistan.

The campaign took place during the extradition case of Meng Wanzhou, which had exacerbated tensions between Canada and China. O'Toole accused Trudeau of being "weak on China", and promised to scale up Canada's hostility towards the country if elected.

According to Shadwick Martin, the tendency to relegate defence and foreign policy to minor appearances continued in 2021. He argues that the Liberals did not deviate from their government's existing foreign policy, while the Conservatives produced a lengthy list of reforms that one commentator described as "scattered and unfocused". The NDP's propositions were essentially unchanged from 2019.

Climate change
As in 2019, Climate change was a major issue in the campaign. In March 2021, Conservative leader O'Toole announced a carbon pricing plan to replace the current Liberal carbon tax, despite previous Conservative opposition to any form of a carbon tax. There was thus a broad consensus among all represented parties for policies to mitigate climate change, although they differed in the emissions targets, the level of the carbon tax, and the transition path to a clean economy. Only the People's Party opposed all climate change policies and vowed to withdraw from the Paris climate accord.

COVID-19
The COVID-19 pandemic was a major campaign issue. The Liberal party sought to defend its pandemic response, while trying to tie Erin O'Toole to Alberta Premier Jason Kenney. O'Toole always sidestepped questions about his previous support for Kenney's pandemic response by saying he would work with any premier to face the pandemic regardless of their political stripes. During the campaign, Alberta was experiencing its worst wave of the pandemic in terms of hospitalisations.

Meanwhile other parties explained what they would have done differently had they been in a similar situation. The Bloc Québecois criticized the amount of money invested in Federal aid for workers, especially the Canada Emergency Response Benefit (CERB). The NDP, on the other hand, criticized the government's "aggressive" crackdown on possibly fraudulent CERB claims, while calling for clawing back wage subsidy payments to companies who fired their workers while received this benefit. The People's Party was the only party opposing vaccine passports, mask mandates and lockdowns.

Gun control
In September 2021, O'Toole changed his position on gun control. Reverting from his initial promise of repealing Prime Minister Trudeau's May 2020 ban on assault weapons, he changed his stance on the issue, promising that he would not repeal the ban. Political commentators and analysts described O'Toole's leadership as shifting the Conservative Party to the political centre.

Implosion of the Green Party
The Green Party of Canada experienced a period of infighting beginning in June 2021, when Jenica Atwin, one of its three MPs, crossed the floor to join the Liberal Party over a dispute regarding the 2021 Israel–Palestine crisis. Although there were calls for the party leader Annamie Paul to resign, she stayed on as leader through the federal election. She spent the majority of the election campaigning in her chosen riding of Toronto Centre, but failed to win the seat.

Rise of the People's Party 
The campaign was also marked by a rise in support for the People's Party of Canada. Before the election, Mainstreet Research gave the party more than 8 per cent of the vote, and Abacus Data noted particularly high scores among Canadians under the age of 60. Justin Trudeau and Yves-François Blanchet indirectly accused the Conservatives for the rise of the PPC, with Trudeau notably criticizing Erin O'Toole for not requiring his party's candidates to be vaccinated.

Campaign slogans

Policy platforms

Platform evaluations
The Parliamentary Budget Officer provides a service to all parties for evaluating the financial impact of any of their proposals, but does not release details until the requesting party has done so as well. After the election, the PBO revealed that 130 requests had been received from all parties, of which only 72 were made public. It did release a report outlining various baselines that were used in its costing exercises.

The Institute of Fiscal Studies and Democracy at the University of Ottawa announced that their analysis of fiscal credibility showed the Liberal party had the best grade, as shown by  the following ratings:

Leaders' debates 

In June 2020, the Leaders' Debates Commission released its report reviewing the 2019 election debates and making recommendations for future debates. The report recommended a permanent and publicly funded commission be tasked with organizing two debates for every federal election.  It also called for the commission, not the government, to set the criteria for participation in future election debates.

The English-language debate gained notoriety when the moderator posed a question to Blanchet that characterized Quebec's law on secularism as "discriminatory". He challenged her use of that word, and the response was seen by some as a turning point in the Bloc's campaign, which gained in the polls after the debate.

On August 29, Ici Radio-Canada Télé hosted a special broadcast consisting of a series of solo interviews with each leader in turn, with questions posed by Patrice Roy, Céline Galipeau and Anne-Marie Dussault. This format was not attempted by any of the other broadcasters.

Opinion polls

Polls in key provinces

Results

Timelines (1993-2021)

Summary results

Full results
The Liberals maintained their status as largest party in the House of Commons. The results were very close to those of the 2019 federal election.

Results by province

Special ballots in the election

Judicial recounts
In a federal election, a judicial recount is automatically ordered in a riding where the margin of victory is less than 0.1 per cent (one one-thousandth) of the votes cast. In cases where there is a larger but still narrow margin of victory, an elector can request a judicial recount. While no validated results triggered an automatic recount in this election, judicial recounts were requested in four ridings: Brome—Missisquoi, Davenport, Châteauguay—Lacolle and Trois-Rivières. Only Châteauguay—Lacolle saw its initial result overturned: the recount had Liberal incumbent MP Brenda Shanahan proclaimed the ultimate winner over Bloc candidate Patrick O'Hara, by a margin of only 12 votes. It was the first time validated results were reversed by a judicial recount since the 2008 election. Recounts in Brome—Missiquoi and Davenport began on October 12; however, in both ridings the early count appeared to confirm the initial validated results, leading both challengers to concede defeat and the recount to be terminated.

Initially, the preliminary results of Charleswood—St. James—Assiniboia—Headingley in the province of Manitoba were so close that the Liberal former MP Doug Eyolfson had just 24 votes fewer than the Conservative incumbent MP Marty Morantz, a margin small enough to trigger an automatic recount. On September 28, Eyolfson conceded after the validated results had widened the gap to 460 votes, which is approximately 1 per cent of the total vote.

10 closest ridings
Incumbents are denoted in bold and followed by (I).

Maps

Analysis and aftermath
The remarkable similarity of the results and those of the 2019 federal election may have reinforced voters' sentiments that the early election was unnecessary, and its meagre results have left their mark on the electorate. A survey by Maru Public Opinion revealed that 77 per cent of respondents believe that Canada is more divided than ever, and 52 per cent feel that Canada's democratic system is broken.

Political parties
Several factors were quickly identified as having had a significant influence on the results. Some political scientists and commentators debated whether the PPC's better performance, compared to the 2019 federal election, contributed to the Conservatives under Erin O'Toole losing to the Liberals. Mainstreet Research CEO Quito Maggi and University of Toronto political science professor Nelson Wiseman posited that the PPC may have cost the Conservatives at least ten ridings. The votes obtained by PPC candidates were larger than the margin of victory in 21 ridings, where the Conservative candidate was in second place (12 in Ontario, five in BC, two in Alberta, one in Quebec and one in Newfoundland). Of those seats, 14 went to the Liberals, six to the NDP, and one to the Bloc; however, it has been described as not a simple generalization, as a significant amount of PPC support arose from non-Conservative voters.

Important vote swings to the Liberals were also noted in ridings with significant Chinese-Canadian populations, with especially large ones arising in Aurora—Oak Ridges—Richmond Hill and Richmond Centre. This was predicted early on in the campaign in polling by Mainstreet Research, which observed that they "were not supporting Conservative candidates in the same way they did in the last couple of elections." While some commentators believed that this may have arisen because of the manner the Tories were handling China-Canada issues, others wondered whether the abnormally large changes were due to disinformation activity occurring in the local Chinese-language media.

Even before the mail-in ballots were counted, the Liberals were projected as leading in 158 seats despite seeing their vote share fall from 33.1 per cent to 32.3 per cent. Gerald Butts, former principal secretary to Trudeau, praised the result as a "smart campaign" that prioritized "vote efficiency"; this view was criticized as detracting from other essential aspects of an election campaign. Other commentators questioned whether the Liberal vote has reached its effective limit, commenting that minority governments have occurred with greater frequency since the Unite the Right movement and the formation of the Conservative Party in 2003.

Had he not been ousted by his caucus, O'Toole would have faced a mandatory leadership review at the next Conservative national conference in 2023. A member of the national council quickly called for a petition to accelerate the process. Other Conservatives urged continued support of O'Toole, and called for the party to unify around him. Most party and caucus members seemed to have appeared to favour a post-mortem review along the lines conducted by the party after the 2004 federal election.

The Green Party saw its share of the vote collapse to 2.3 per cent, its lowest level since the 2000 federal election. Internal dissension and poor morale contributed to the decline, and Elizabeth May has called for an inquiry to determine the underlying reasons for it. Paul announced her resignation as party leader on September 27.

Calls for electoral reform
Commentators at The Conversation noted that for a second election in a row the Liberals won the greatest number of seats but lost the popular vote to the Conservatives under the first-past-the-post (FPTP) voting system. During the campaign, Trudeau said he remains open to getting rid of Canada's FPTP if re-elected, provided there is consensus on the issue; he also expressed his preference for ranked voting over proportional representation. Trudeau had promised during the 2015 campaign that the 2015 federal election would be the last federal election to use FPTP.

Candidates elected
Forty-nine MPs were elected for the first time, and two more (Randy Boissonnault and John Aldag) returned after having been defeated in 2019. The number of female MPs—103, up from 100 in 2019—is a record high for the House, and 22 of the first-time MPs are women.

Kevin Vuong, whose candidacy was disavowed by the Liberals after nominations had closed, still won the riding of Spadina—Fort York. Vuong announced that he would take his seat as an independent upon being sworn in. Adam Vaughan, the previous incumbent, called on Vuong to resign as his victory was "compromised". In a radio interview in November, Vuong apologized to his supporters, and he later said, "Of the many, many people who have reached out since my interview, they've encouraged me to move forward. And that's what I'm going to be doing."

George Chahal, elected in Calgary Skyview, was the subject of several complaints concerning the removal of campaign flyers of another candidate, substituting them with his own. In January 2022, he accepted and paid a $500 administrative monetary penalty assessed by the Commissioner of Canada Elections in the matter, saying, "It's just a late night on an election campaign. Call it a dumb mistake or brain fogit really doesn't matter why I did what I did. I think what matters is I did it. And I acknowledged it fully, openly, publicly."

Retrospective allegations of Chinese interference

A year following the election, Conservative Party politicians including former leader Erin O'Toole blamed Chinese government interference as a factor behind the loss for the party. In a 2022 interview on the UnCommons podcast with Nathaniel Erskine-Smith, O'Toole opined that media outfits linked to the Chinese Communist Party could have cost the Conservatives up to "eight or nine seats.".

O'Toole's beliefs were supported by Conservative MP and foreign affairs critic Michael Chong who stated that while the party was initially hesitant to blame China for influencing the vote due to inconclusive evidence at the time, he now believed "The communist leadership in Beijing did interfere in the last federal election by spreading disinformation through proxies on Chinese-language social media platforms that contributed to the defeat of a number of Conservative MPs" citing a report by McGill University. Similar views were shared by O'Toole's director of parliamentary affairs Mitch Heimpel who claimed Canadian national security officers had contacted the Conservatives around election day to express concerns about potential foreign interference. Heimpel also cited the example of former Conservative MP Kenny Chiu who had been targeted by a misinformation campaign by the Chinese social media platform WeChat. Research into alleged electoral interference by McGill University indicated that there was no specific riding specific data to draw a full conclusion on the impact of potential interference and noted "Canadian-Chinese issues were not central to the campaign nor were they top of mind for voters" but concurred researchers had found Chinese state media had worked "with an apparent aim to convince Canadians of Chinese origin to vote against the Conservative Party."

In February 2023, The Globe and Mail published a series of articles, reporting that the Canadian Security Intelligence Service, in several classified documents, advised that China had employed disinformation campaigns and undisclosed donations to support preferred candidates during the campaign, all with the aim of ensuring that the Liberals would win again, but only with a minority. Other illegal tactics under the Canada Elections Act were also revealed, such as directing international students to work for preferred candidates (ostensibly as volunteers, but being paid by sympathetic business owners), and arranging for sympathetic donors to contribute to such campaigns, with the difference between their payments and the resulting tax credits being returned to them. The Procedure and House Affairs Committee of the House of Commons met to discuss these reports, and voted to expand their current inquiry into the 2019 election to include the 2021 election as well.

See also
 List of Canadian federal general elections

Notes and references

Notes

References

External links
 Elections Canada

 
Federal election, 44
September 2021 events in Canada